Bryan Harvey Bjarnason (April 2, 1924 – September 8, 2022) was a Canadian real estate and insurance agent and political figure in Saskatchewan. He represented Kelvington from 1964 to 1969 in the Legislative Assembly of Saskatchewan as a Liberal.

Bjarnason was born in Dana, Saskatchewan in April 1924, the son of John Helgi Bjarnason and Bjarnina Thorsteinson, both of Icelandic descent, and was educated in Leslie and in Foam Lake. He served in the Royal Canadian Air Force during World War II. In 1947, Bjarnason married Evelyn McVean, who predeceased him in January 2013. He lived in Foam Lake. His election to the provincial assembly in 1967 was declared invalid and he lost the subsequent by-election held in 1969 to Neil Byers.

Bjarnason died on September 8, 2022, at the age of 98.

References 

1924 births
2022 deaths
Canadian people of Icelandic descent
Royal Canadian Air Force personnel of World War II
Saskatchewan Liberal Party MLAs